, or Production IMS, was a Japanese animation studio established on February 14, 2013, by former staff members from AIC Spirits. Its headquarters were located in Nerima, Tokyo, Japan.

Financial problems
On December 20, 2017, animator Teru Miyazaki posted then deleted a tweet on Twitter stating that an anime studio, implied to be Production IMS, was not paying its animators. On June 7 the following year, credit research company Tokyo Shoko Research reported that Production IMS began consolidating its debts and that the staff was considering filing for bankruptcy. The company did later file for bankruptcy on September 21, 2018, and closed on October 11 of the same year.

List of works

Television series
 Inari, Konkon, Koi Iroha (January 15, 2014 – March 19, 2014)
 Date A Live II (April 11, 2014 – June 13, 2014)
 Gonna be the Twin-Tail!! (October 9, 2014 – December 25, 2014)
 The Testament of Sister New Devil (January 7, 2015 – March 25, 2015)
 Castle Town Dandelion (July 2, 2015 – September 17, 2015)
 The Testament of Sister New Devil Burst (October 9, 2015 – December 11, 2015)
 Active Raid (January 7, 2016 – September 27, 2016) – Co-production with Orange
 Hundred (April 4, 2016 – June 20, 2016)
 High School Fleet (April 9, 2016 – June 25, 2016)
 Hybrid × Heart Magias Academy Ataraxia (July 5, 2016 – September 20, 2016)
 Takunomi. (January 11, 2018 – March 29, 2018)

Original video animations
 Inari Konkon: Cicada Chorus (2014)
 Date A Live: Encore (2014)
 The Testament of Sister New Devil (2015)
 The Testament of Sister New Devil Burst (2016)
 High School Fleet (2017)
 The Testament of Sister New Devil: Departures (2018)

Films
 Heaven's Lost Property Final – The Movie: Eternally My Master (April 26, 2014)
 Date A Live: The Movie – Mayuri Judgement (August 22, 2015)

References

External links

  
 

 
Japanese companies established in 2013
Mass media companies established in 2013
Mass media companies disestablished in 2018
Japanese companies disestablished in 2018
Japanese animation studios
Animation studios in Tokyo
Companies that have filed for bankruptcy in Japan
Defunct mass media companies of Japan